Pseudomonas hot-foot syndrome is a self-limited cutaneous condition that occurs on the plantar surface of children after swimming in pool water that has high concentrations of P. aeruginosa. The condition typically presents as plantar purple-red nodules.

See also 
 Pseudomonal pyoderma
 List of cutaneous conditions

References 

Bacterium-related cutaneous conditions